Colhuehuapisuchus is an extinct genus of peirosaurid notosuchian known from the Late Cretaceous Lago Colhué Huapí Formation in Argentina. It contains a single species, Colhuehuapisuchus lunai.

References 

Crocodylomorphs
Cretaceous Argentina